The 6th Iowa Cavalry Regiment was a cavalry regiment that served in the Union Army during the Indian Wars.

Service
The 6th Iowa Cavalry was mustered into Federal service at Davenport, Iowa, for a three-year enlistment between January 31 to March 5, 1863. In 1864, eleven of the regiment's twelve companies were part of Lieutenant Colonel Samuel M. Pollock's 1st Brigade of Brigadier General Alfred Sully's District of Iowa. In this organization, these companies participated in the Northwestern Indian Expedition, fighting at the Battle of Killdeer Mountain and in the Battle of the Badlands. The regiment was mustered out of Federal service on October 17, 1865.

Total strength and casualties
A total of  1420 men served in the 6th Iowa at one time or another during its existence.
It suffered 1 officer and 21 enlisted men who were killed in action or who died of their wounds and 1 officer and 74 enlisted men who died of disease, for a total of 97 fatalities.

Commanders
 Colonel David S. Wilson
 Colonel Samuel McLean Pollock

See also
List of Iowa Civil War Units
Iowa in the American Civil War

Notes

References
The Civil War Archive

Units and formations of the Union Army from Iowa
1863 establishments in Iowa
Military units and formations established in 1863
Military units and formations disestablished in 1865